Châteauneuf-les-Martigues is a commune in the Bouches-du-Rhône department in southern France. The La Mède refinery is nearby and has been in operation since 1935.

Population

See also
 Étang de Berre
Communes of the Bouches-du-Rhône department

References

Communes of Bouches-du-Rhône
Bouches-du-Rhône communes articles needing translation from French Wikipedia